A stovepipe organization (alt organisations) has a structure which largely or entirely restricts the flow of information within the organization to up-down through lines of control, inhibiting or preventing cross-organisational communication. Many traditional, large (especially governmental or transnational) organizations have (or risk having) a stovepipe pattern. Intelligence organizations may deliberately adopt a stovepipe pattern so that a breach or compromise in one area cannot easily spread to others. A famous example of this is Bletchley Park (an allied forces Second World War codebreaking centre where messages encrypted by the Enigma machine were decrypted) where people working in one hut would not know what the people in any other hut did.

A stovepipe pattern is most likely to develop in organisations that have some or all of the following characteristics:
 Very hierarchical with sharply defined roles or areas of influence (e.g. regional sales teams)
 Long reporting lines (i.e. many intermediary layers of management) and narrow spans of control (each manager only has a small number of direct reports)
 Departmental organization of information technology, human resources and similar functions, especially where applications and services are procured departmentally rather than via a central procurement section
 Culture of suspicion or a dictatorial management style
 Multiple sites (or sub sites within a larger site) where staff have little chance to interact on a regular basis with staff from another site
 Formed by the merger of two organizations or the acquisition of one organisation by another

A stovepipe pattern can be very harmful to a commercial organization as it can lead to duplication of effort in different parts of the organisation and, in extreme cases, unhealthy competition between different branches of the organization.

Strategies to avoid this can include:
 Centralization of information technology, human resources, procurement and similar functions
 Short reporting lines
 Decentralised cross functional teams for executing one-time projects and ongoing operations
 Fewer sites or movement of staff between sites
 Increased mobility of staff between teams to promote individual and organizational breadth
 Culture of openness and supportive management style driven from the senior management
 Rapid integration of staff after a merger or acquisition

See also
 Information silo
 Mushroom management
 Stovepipe system
 Compartmentalization

References

 Charles Handy "Understanding Organisations"
 Tom DeMarco & Timothy Lister "Peopleware"
 Office of Government Commerce "ITIL: Best Practices for Service Delivery"

Organizational structure